Rameen Shamim (born 19 January 1996) is a Pakistani cricketer who plays as a right-arm off break bowler for Pakistan. She has played domestic cricket for Karachi, Sindh, Omar Associates and Saif Sports Saga. In April 2019, she was named in Pakistan's squad for their series against South Africa. She made her Women's Twenty20 International (WT20I) debut for Pakistan against South Africa on 18 May 2019. In November 2019, she was named in Pakistan's squad for their series against England in Malaysia. She made her Women's One Day International (WODI) debut for Pakistan, against England, on 9 December 2019.

In June 2021, Shamim was named as the captain of Pakistan women's A Team for their one-day matches against the West Indies. In October 2021, she was named in Pakistan's team for the 2021 Women's Cricket World Cup Qualifier tournament in Zimbabwe.

References

External links
 
 

1996 births
Living people
Cricketers from Karachi
Pakistani women cricketers
Pakistan women One Day International cricketers
Pakistan women Twenty20 International cricketers
Karachi women cricketers
Sindh women cricketers
Omar Associates women cricketers
Saif Sports Saga women cricketers